José Omar Perdomo Machado (born 3 July 1993) is a Spanish footballer who plays for San Fernando CD as a winger.

Club career
Born in Las Palmas, Canary Islands, Perdomo graduated with Universidad de Las Palmas CF's youth setup, and made his senior debuts in the 2010–11 campaign, in the Segunda División B. In the 2011 summer he moved to UD Las Palmas, returning to youth football.

After representing the latter's C and B-sides, Perdomo moved to CF Unión Viera in 2013. After scoring 11 goals for the club he joined Atlético Madrid in January 2014, being assigned to the C-team also in the fourth level.

In the 2014 summer Perdomo signed for Estrella CF, but on 22 January 2015, joined another reserve team, CD Tenerife B in the fourth division. He made his first-team debut for the latter on 10 May, coming on as a late substitute for Javi Moyano in a 0–1 away loss against Racing de Santander in the Segunda División.

Perdomo scored his first professional goal on 25 October 2015, netting his team's first in a 2–2 home draw against CA Osasuna. The following 1 April he renewed his contract until 2018, being definitely promoted to the main squad.

On 13 July 2017, Perdomo was loaned to fellow second tier club Gimnàstic de Tarragona for one year, with a permanent three-year deal subsequently arranged. The following 6 June, it was announced that Tenerife opted against his return, and he signed for Nàstic permanently.

On 31 January 2019, Perdomo signed for third division side UD Ibiza after terminating his contract with the Catalans.

References

External links

1993 births
Living people
Footballers from Las Palmas
Spanish footballers
Association football wingers
Segunda División players
Segunda División B players
Tercera División players
Divisiones Regionales de Fútbol players
Universidad de Las Palmas CF footballers
UD Las Palmas C players
UD Las Palmas Atlético players
Atlético Madrid C players
CD Tenerife B players
CD Tenerife players
Gimnàstic de Tarragona footballers
UD Ibiza players
San Fernando CD players